Phu Laen Kha National Park is a national park in Thailand with a total area of 125,312.50  rai (about 200.50 km2) covering Amphoe Kaset Sombun, Amphoe Nong Bua Daeng, Amphoe Mueang Chaiyaphum and Amphoe Ban Khwao of Chaiyaphum Province in northeastern region.

Phu Laen Kha is a 180th national park of Thailand. It is an area consists of complicated mountains and plateaus approx 200 (656 ft) to 725 m (2378 ft) above the sea level. There are many unique and beautiful places include interesting viewpoints. There is also hiking and camping in the area and also many other tourist attractions to see and explore. The best time to visit is between May to December.

In addition, visitors can continue to travel from here to another three national parks nearby in Chaiyaphum, namely Pa Hin Ngam,  Sai Thong and Tat Ton.

Sights
Mo Hin Khao (มอหินขาว) is an iconic rock formation on the sward, similar to Stonehenge of England. Therefore, it is known as "Thailand Stonehenge", regarded as both the symbol and the landmark that is best known for the national park. In addition, this place was also selected to be one of the 2009 TV commercial locations of Tourism Authority of Thailand (TAT) under the campaign "12 Months 7 Stars 9 Suns" (12 เดือน 7 ดาว 9 ตะวัน) presented by Thongchai "Bird" McIntyre.
 
Pha Hua Nak (ผาหัวนาค), cliff and viewpoint that are not far from Mo Hin Khao (about 4 km (2 mi)). Pha Hua Nak is about 905 m (2969 ft) above average sea level and can see the Mueang Chaiyaphum below, with cool temperatures throughout the day. On the opposite side of Pha Hua Nak is the Phang Heuy mountain range (เทือกเขาพังเหย). Its name refers to "Naga [mythical serpent]'s head cliff", according to its characteristics.
Pha Kluai Mai (ผากล้วยไม้), another viewpoint cliff of the park.
Hin Prasart (หินปราสาท), a striking natural upright rock apart from Mo Hin Khao.
Pratu Khlong (ประตูโขลง), a strange stone that looks like a beautiful arch.

References

External links

National parks of Thailand
Tourist attractions in Chaiyaphum province
1996 establishments in Thailand
Protected areas established in 1996